Zehnder is a German-language surname. Notable people of this surname include the following:

Eduard Zehnder, Swiss mathematician
Eugen Zehnder (1917–1991), highly decorated German soldier in World War II
Gladys Zender (born 1939), Peruvian model, Miss Universe 1957
Jean-Claude Zehnder (born 1941), Swiss organist and musicologist
Kaspar Zehnder (born 1970), Swiss conductor and flautist
Ludwig Zehnder (1854–1949), Swiss physicist
Manuela Zehnder (born 1983), Swiss squash player

See also
Zehnder Confair (1906–1982), member of the Pennsylvania State Senate

German-language surnames